Steel Rule Die (A Die (manufacturing) Made Using a Material Called "Steel Die"
Ruler (A Ruler Made Using Steel)